Ingvard Nørregaard (13 May 1914 – 11 October 1985) is a Danish sprint canoer who competed in the early 1950s. He won a silver medal in the K-2 10000 m event at the 1950 ICF Canoe Sprint World Championships in Copenhagen.

Nørregaard also finished eighth in the K-2 10000 m event at the 1952 Summer Olympics in Helsinki.

References

Sports-reference.com profile

1914 births
1965 deaths
Canoeists at the 1952 Summer Olympics
Danish male canoeists
Olympic canoeists of Denmark
ICF Canoe Sprint World Championships medalists in kayak